Nuño González de Lara may refer to:.
Nuño González de Lara (died 1275), nicknamed el Bueno
Nuño González de Lara (died 1291), son of the preceding
 Nuño González de Lara (died 1296), nephew of the preceding